"Good Song" is a song by English band Blur and is the fourth track on their seventh studio album, Think Tank (2003). In October 2003, the song was released as the third and final single from that album, peaking at number 22 on the UK Singles Chart. The single was Blur's lowest placing single since 1993's "Sunday Sunday", ending the bands consecutive run of Top 20 singles. The promo video is an awarded animation directed by David Shrigley and the group Shynola. "Good Song" was originally called "De La Soul" after the hip-hop group. Damon Albarn would later collaborate with members of De La Soul for the Gorillaz singles "Feel Good Inc." and "Superfast Jellyfish". Graham Coxon, who had previously left the group, plays on the single's B-side "Morricone".

Track listings
 7-inch
 "Good Song"
 "Morricone"

 CD
 "Good Song"
 "Me, White Noise" (alternate version)

 DVD
 "Good Song" (video)
 "Me, White Noise" (alternate version)
 "Morricone"
 "Good Song" (animatic)

Production credits
 "Good Song", "Me, White Noise" (alternate version) and "Morricone" produced by Blur and Ben Hillier
 Damon Albarn: Lead Vocals, Guitar, Synthesizers
 Alex James: Bass Guitar, Backing Vocals
 Dave Rowntree: Drum Machine, Backing Vocals
 Ben Hillier: Turntables

Charts

See also
 List of anti-war songs

References

Song recordings produced by Ben Hillier
Songs written by Damon Albarn
Blur (band) songs
2003 singles
2003 songs
Parlophone singles
Songs written by Alex James (musician)
Songs written by Dave Rowntree
Animated music videos